August Schmarsow (26 May 1853, Schildfeld – 19 January 1936, Baden-Baden) was a German art historian.

Biography 
He was born in Schildfeld (now part of Vellahn), Mecklenburg-Schwerin, and was educated in Zürich,  Strassburg and Bonn.  He became docent of the history of art at Göttingen in 1881, professor there in 1882, at Breslau in 1885, and went to Florence in 1892, and thence to Leipzig in 1893.

In 1888 he founded the Kunsthistorisches Institut in Florenz (Institute for the History of Art, Florence), an institution to promote original research in the history of Italian art, now part of the Max Planck Society, a German state institution.

Literary works 
His writings are characterized by sound scholarship and acute criticism.  He wrote biographies of David D'Angers, Ingres, and Prudhon in Robert Dohme's Kunst und Kunstler; Raphael und Pinturicchio in Siena (1880); he also wrote:  
 Melozzo da Forli (1886)
 Giovanni Santi (1887
 St. Martin von Lucca und die Anfänge der toskanischen Sculptur im Mittelalter (1889)
 Masaccio-Studien (1895–99), with atlas
 Barock und Rokoko (1897)
 Grundbegriffe der Kunstwissenschaft (1905)
 Federigo Barocci (1909–10)
 Gherardo Starnina (1912)

References
 
 

1853 births
1936 deaths
People from Ludwigslust-Parchim
People from the Grand Duchy of Mecklenburg-Schwerin
German art historians
German male non-fiction writers
Academic staff of the University of Göttingen
Academic staff of the University of Breslau
Academic staff of Leipzig University